The 1986 Alaska gubernatorial election took place on November 4, 1986, for the post of Governor of Alaska.  Incumbent Governor Bill Sheffield, a Democrat who was seeking re-election, was defeated by Steve Cowper in the Democratic primary election on August 26, 1986.

In the general election, Democratic state Representative Steve Cowper defeated Republican candidate Arliss Sturgulewski and Alaska Independence candidate Joe Vogler. Sturgulewski had defeated former governor Wally Hickel, former Libertarian nominee Dick Randolph, former State House Speaker Joe L. Hayes, and former Alaskan Independence nominee Don Wright for the Republican nomination.

Results

References

Gubernatorial
1986
Alaska